Free to Fly is the seventh album and fifth studio album by Contemporary Christian group Point of Grace. It was released in 2001 by Word Records.

Track listing
 "By Heart" (Dane DeViller, Sean Hosien, Pam Sheyne) - 3:38
 "You Will Never Walk Alone" (Lowell Alexander) - 4:24
 "He Sends His Love" (Jeremy Bose, Paul Evans) - 4:35
 "Praise Forevermore" (Darlene Zschech) - 4:33
 "Blue Skies" (Grant Cunningham, Matt Huesmann) - 4:20
 "Begin With Me" (Steve Siler, David Tyson) - 3:15
 "Free Indeed" (Grant Cunningham, Matt Huesmann) - 3:55
 "All That I Need" (Glenn Garrett, Wayne Tester) - 4:08
 "Something So Good" (Jack Blades, Brent Bourgeois, Jane Vaughan) - 3:41
 "Yes, I Believe" (Joel Lindsay, Tony Wood) - 4:35
 "La La La" (Brent Wilson) - 4:49

Singles
 "Blue Skies" - #1
 "Praise Forevermore" - #1
 "He Sends His Love" - #1
 "You Will Never Walk Alone - #1
 "Yes, I Believe" - #5

Music videos
 "Begin With Me"

Personnel 

Point of Grace
 Shelley Breen – vocals 
 Heather Payne – vocals 
 Denise Jones – vocals 
 Terry Jones – vocals 

Musicians
 David Tyson – keyboards, programming 
 Pat Coil – acoustic piano 
 Blair Masters – keyboards, acoustic piano, Hammond B3 organ
 Bernie Herms – programming 
 Dan Muckala – keyboards, programming 
 Nathan Nockels – keyboards 
 Phil Madeira – Hammond B3 organ 
 Glenn Garrett – programming (8)
 Wayne Tester – programming (8)
 Rusty Anderson – guitars 
 David Cleveland – guitars 
 Alan Darby – nylon guitar, drums 
 Scott Denté – guitars, acoustic guitar 
 Jerry McPherson – guitars 
 Chris Rodriguez – guitars 
 Schuyler Deale – bass 
 Mark Hill – bass 
 Pat Malone – bass 
 Jimmie Lee Sloas – bass 
 Steve Brewster – drums, percussion
 Dan Needham – drums 
 John Catchings – cello 
 Tom Howard – string arrangements and conductor 
 Carl Gorodetzky – string contractor 
 The Nashville String Machine – strings 
 Carl Marsh – arrangements, string arrangements 
 Gavyn Wright – concertmaster 
 The London Session Orchestra – strings
 Michael Mellett – vocal arrangements 
 Chance Scoggins – vocal arrangements

Production 
 David Tyson – producer (1, 7, 9, 11)
 Brown Bannister – producer (2, 5, 6)
 Tom Laune – producer (3, 4, 10), engineer (3, 4, 10), mixing (3, 4, 10)
 Nathan Nockels – producer (3, 4, 10)
 Glenn Garrett – producer (8), overdub recording (8)
 Wayne Tester – producer (8), overdub recording (8)
 Point of Grace – executive producers
 Loren Balman – A&R direction 
 Linda Bourne Wornell – A&R coordinator 
 Jonathan Allen – engineer 
 Steve Bishir – engineer, mixing 
 Ronnie Brookshire – engineer, string engineer 
 Bill Cooper – engineer 
 Roger Sommers – engineer 
 Chris Rowe – vocal recording 
 Aaron Swihart – engineer, tracking 
 Jeff Thomas – overdub recording 
 Drew Bollman – assistant engineer 
 Rob Burrell – assistant engineer 
 Andrew Dudman – assistant engineer 
 J.C. Monterrosa – assistant engineer
 Hank Nirider – assistant engineer, mix assistant 
 Fred Paragano – assistant engineer
 David Streit – assistant engineer 
 Ken Love – mastering at MasterMix (Nashville, Tennessee).
 Tony DeFranco – production assistant 
 Traci Sterling Bishir – production coordinator 
 Bridgett Evans O'Lannerghty – production assistant 
 Chuck Hargett – art direction, design 
 Michael Haber – photography 
 Bertrand – hair stylist 
 Pauline Leonard – wardrobe

Notes
 This was Terry's last full studio album with the group, as she would leave the group on February 29, 2004.
 This was also the last album that involved songwriter Grant Cunningham, who died in July 2002 from injuries caused by a fall in a recreational soccer match in the Nashville region.  A foundation named in Cunningham's memory was titled after the Point of Grace song "Blue Skies" from this album. 
 This was the group's last release with the Word Records management team, as they would be released in January 2002 by the label's new owners.

References

2001 albums
Point of Grace albums
Albums produced by Brown Bannister